Dorothy Scharf (1942–2004) was a reclusive art collector who left 51 valuable paintings to the Courtauld Institute in her will. Her collection, containing works by such eminent artists as John Constable and Thomas Gainsborough, covers the "Golden Age" of English painting. Perhaps the most famous work in the collection is Margate Pier by J. M. W. Turner, once owned by US President Franklin D. Roosevelt. The artworks were first exhibited in October 2007.

Notes

External links
The Courtauld Institute
Sue Bond

1942 births
2004 deaths
English philanthropists
20th-century British philanthropists